This article lists the main modern pentathlon events and their results for 2009.

2010 YOG qualification events
 October 1 – 5: YOG 2010 Continental Qualifier - Europe in  Budapest
 Youth Individual winners:  Pawel Golik (m) /  Zsófia Földházi (f)
 Youth Team Relay winner:  Alexandra Savvina
 December 3 – 6: YOG 2010 Continental Qualifier - Pan America in  Buenos Aires
 Youth Individual winners:  Andrei Gheorghe (m) /  Yane Marques (f)
 December 5: YOG 2010 Qualifier in  Buenos Aires
 Youth Individual winners:  Jorge Abraham Camacho (m) /  Tamara Vega (f)
 December 18 – 20: YOG 2010 Continental Qualifier - Asia & Oceania in 
 Youth Individual winners:  PARK Sang-gu (m) /  ZHU Wenjing (f)

World modern pentathlon championships
 July 6 – 12: 2009 World Junior Modern Pentathlon Championships in  Kaohsiung
 Junior Individual winners:  AHN Ji-hun (m) /  Aya Medany (f)
 Junior Team Relay winners:  AHN Ji-hun (m) /  Janine Kohlmann (f)
 Junior Mixed winner:  Yang Soo-jin
 July 22 – 27: 2009 World Youth "A" Modern Pentathlon Championships in  Cairo
 Youth Individual winners:  Gergely Demeter (m) /  Zsófia Földházi (f)
 Youth Team Relay winners:  KIM Soeng-jin (m) /  Zsófia Földházi (f)
 Youth Mixed winner:  GUO Jing
 August 11 – 19: 2009 World Modern Pentathlon Championships in  London
 Individual winners:  Ádám Marosi (m) /  Chen Qian (f)
 Mixed Team Relay winners:  (David Svoboda & Lucie Grolichová)

Continental modern pentathlon championships
 April 28 – May 3: 2009 European Junior Modern Pentathlon Championships in  Albena
 Junior Individual winners:  Maxim Kuznetsov (m) /  Sarolta Kovács (f)
 Junior Team Relay winners:  Remigiusz Golis (m) /  Sarolta Kovács (f)
 Junior Mixed winner:  Natalie Dianová
 June 5 – 7: 2009 NORCECA Modern Pentathlon Championships in  Palm Springs
 Individual winners:  Dennis Bowsher (m) /  Margaux Isaksen (f)
 June 7 – 13: 2009 Asian Modern Pentathlon Championships in  Seoul
 Individual winners:  Jung Jin-hwa (m) /  Xiu Xiu (f)
 Team Relay winners:  Shinichi Tomii (m) /  (Chen Qian & ZHU Wenjing) (f)
 June 25 – 30: 2009 European Modern Pentathlon Championships in  Leipzig
 Individual winners:  Ondřej Polívka (m) /  Amélie Cazé (f)
 Team Relay winners:  Edvinas Krungolcas (m) /  Lucie Grolichová (f)
 July 1 – 5: 2009 European Youth "B" Modern Pentathlon Championships in  Abrantes
 Youth Individual winners:  Michal Gralewski (m) /  Zsófia Földházi (f)
 Youth Team Relay winners:  Michal Gralewski (m) /  Zsófia Földházi (f)

2009 Modern Pentathlon World Cup
 March 24 – 29: MPWC #1 in  Mexico City
 Note: This event was supposed to be held in Palm Springs, but it was cancelled.
 Individual winners:  Marcin Horbacz (m) /  Aya Medany (f)
 April 16 – 19: MPWC #2 in  Cairo
 Individual winners:  Ondřej Polívka (m) /  Laura Asadauskaitė (f)
 May 7 – 10: MPWC #3 for Men in  Budapest
 Winner:  Deniss Čerkovskis
 May 14 – 17: MPWC #3 for Women in  Székesfehérvár
 Winner:  Laura Asadauskaitė
 May 20 – 25: MPWC #4 in  Rome
 Individual winners:  Ilia Frolov (m) /  Aya Medany (f)
 September 11 – 13: MPWC #5 (final) in  Rio de Janeiro
 Individual winners:  Ádám Marosi (m) /  Donata Rimšaitė (f)

References

External links
 Union Internationale de Pentathlon Moderne Website (UIPM)

 
Modern pentathlon
2009 in sports